John McAndrew may refer to:
 John McAndrew (Gaelic footballer)
 John McAndrew (cricketer)
 John Alfred McAndrew, Ontario lawyer and political figure